Battles of the American Civil War were fought between April 12, 1861, and May 12–13, 1865 in 19 states, mostly Confederate (Alabama, Arkansas, Florida, Georgia, Kansas, Kentucky, Louisiana, Maryland, Mississippi, Missouri, North Carolina, Ohio, Pennsylvania, South Carolina, Tennessee, Texas, Vermont, Virginia, and West Virginia), the District of Columbia, and six territories (Arizona Territory (also Confederate Arizona), Colorado Territory, Dakota Territory, Indian Territory (present-day Oklahoma), New Mexico Territory, and Washington Territory), as well as naval engagements. Virginia in particular was the site of many major and decisive battles. These battles would change the standing and historical memory of the United States.

For lists of battles organized by campaign and theater, see the list below:
 Eastern Theater of the American Civil War
 Western Theater of the American Civil War
 Trans-Mississippi Theater of the American Civil War
 Pacific Coast Theater of the American Civil War
 Lower Seaboard Theater of the American Civil War
 :Category:Battles of the American Civil War

Some battles have more than one name; e.g., the battles known in the North as Battle of Antietam and Second Battle of Bull Run were referred to as the Battle of Sharpsburg and the Battle of Manassas, respectively, by the South. This was because the North tended to name battles after landmarks (often rivers or bodies of water), whereas the South named battles after nearby towns.

Battles rated by CWSAC
The American Battlefield Protection Program (ABPP) was established within the United States National Park Service to classify the preservation status of historic battlefield land. In 1993, the Civil War Sites Advisory Commission (CWSAC) reported to Congress and the ABPP on their extensive analysis of significant battles and battlefields. Of the estimated 8,000 occasions in which hostilities occurred in the American Civil War, this table and related articles describe the 384 battles that were classified in CWSAC's Report on the Nation's Civil War Battlefields. In addition to the status of battlefield land preservation (not included in this table) CWSAC rated the military significance of the battles into four classes, as follows:

{| width=90%
|Class A – Decisive: A general engagement involving field armies in which a commander achieved a vital strategic objective.  Such a result might include an indisputable victory on the field or be limited to the success or termination of a campaign offensive. Decisive battles had a direct, observable impact on the direction, duration, conduct, or outcome of the war.
|-
|Class B – Major: An engagement of magnitude involving field armies or divisions of the armies in which a commander achieved an important strategic objective within the context of an ongoing campaign offensive. Major battles had a direct, observable impact on the direction, duration, conduct, or outcome of the campaign.
|-
| Class C – Formative: An engagement involving divisions or detachments of the field armies in which a commander accomplished a limited campaign objective of reconnaissance, disruption, defense, or occupation. Formative battles had an observable influence on the direction, duration, or conduct of the campaign.
|-
| Class D – Limited: An engagement, typically involving detachments of the field armies, in which a commander achieved a limited tactical objective of reconnaissance, defense, or occupation. Limited battles maintained contact between the combatants without observable influence on the direction of the campaign.
|}

Other USA/CSA battles
Other non-Indian wars battles and skirmishes not rated by CWSAC.

Other battles in the American Indian Wars
Other battles and skirmishes, not rated by CWSAC, of the American Indian Wars between either USA or CSA forces and the Apache, Arapaho, Cheyenne, Comanche, Dakota, Kiowa, Navajo, and Shoshone which occurred during the American Civil War – including: the Apache Wars, Colorado War, Dakota War of 1862, Navajo Wars, and Texas–Indian wars.

Troop engagements

This is a chronological summary and record of every engagement between the troops of the Union and of the Confederacy, showing the total losses and casualties in each engagement. It was collated and compiled from the Official Records of the War Department.

This summary has been divided by year:
 1861
 1862
 1863
 1864
 1865

See also

 List of costliest American Civil War land battles
 Timeline of events leading to the American Civil War
 Bibliography of the American Civil War
 Bibliography of Ulysses S. Grant

Notes

References

Sources
 Lossing, Benson J., LL.D.  A History of the Civil War 1861–65: And the Causes that Led Up to the Great Conflict. New York: The War Memorial Association, 1912.

External links
 Spreadsheet of over 5,000 Civil War battles and incidents

Battles
Battles
American Civil War
Battles Civil War